The Mettā Sutta is the name used for two Buddhist discourses (Pali: sutta) found in the Pali Canon. The one, more often chanted by Theravadin monks, is also referred to as Karaṇīyamettā Sutta after the opening word, Karaṇīyam, "(This is what) should be done." It is found in the Suttanipāta (Sn 1.8) and Khuddakapāṭha (Khp 9). It is ten verses in length and it extols both the virtuous qualities and the meditative development of mettā (Pali), traditionally translated as "loving kindness" or "friendliness". Additionally, Thanissaro Bhikkhu's translation, "goodwill",  underscores that the practice is used to develop wishes for unconditional goodwill towards the object of the wish.

The other, also chanted by Theravadin Buddhist monks at times, extols the benefits of the practice of mettā (Pali) and it is found in the Anguttara Nikaya (AN 11.15). is also referred to as Mettānisamsa Sutta. This article will focus on the first version.

Background
In Theravāda Buddhism's Pali Canon, mettā is one of the four "divine abodes" (Pali: brahmavihāra) recommended for cultivating interpersonal harmony and meditative concentration (see, for instance, kammaṭṭhāna).  In later canonical works (such as the Cariyāpiṭaka), mettā is one of ten "perfections" (pāramī) that facilitates the attainment of awakening (Bodhi) and is a prerequisite to attaining Buddhahood.

According to post-canonical Sutta Nipāta commentary, the background story for the Mettā Sutta is that a group of monks were frightened by the earth devas in the forest where the Buddha had sent them to meditate.  When the monks seek the Buddha's advice in dealing with the situation, the Buddha taught the monks the Mettā Sutta as an antidote to overcome their fear. The monks recited the sutta and radiate loving-kindness. Their good-will placed the earth devas to be at ease and stay quiet as well.

Contents
The Mettā Sutta contains a number of recollections or recitations that promote the development of mettā through virtuous characteristics and meditation.

The discourse identifies fifteen moral qualities and conditions conducive to the development of mettā.  These include such qualities as being non-deceptive (uju), sincere (suju), easy to correct (suvaco), gentle (mudu) and without arrogance (anatimānī).

In terms of meditative development, the discourse identifies:
 an intentional wish that facilitates generating mettā (Pali: sukhino vā khemino hontu; English: "May all beings be happy and safe")
 a means for developing meditational objects (a list of various sizes, proximity, etc.) for such a wish
 a metaphor — of a mother's protective love for her only child — for how one should cherish this meditation theme and guard it safely. (Note: this is often - indeed, almost universally - misinterpreted as a prototypical metaphor for the feeling we ought to cultivate toward others; however, this is not its intended meaning, as explained by Thanissaro Bhikkhu in the article "Metta Means Goodwill.")
 a method for radiating mettā outwards in all directions

Yassānubhavato yakkhā

Neva dessanti bhīsanam

Yañhicevānuyuñjanto

Yattindiva matandito

Sukham supati sutto ca

Pāpam kiñci na passati

Evamādi guṇūpetam

Payittam tan bhaṇāma he

Karaniya matthakusalena 

Yan tam santam padam abhisamecca

Sakko uju cha suju cha 

suvaco cassa mudu anatimani

Santussako va subharo va 

appakicco va sallahukavutti

santindriyo va nipako va 

appagabbho kulesu ananugiddho

Na cha khuddam samachare 

Kiñ ci yena viññuu pare upavadeyyum

Sukhino va khemino hontu 

Sabbe sattaa bhavantu sukhitatta

Ye keci panabhut'atthi 

Tasa va thavara va anavasesa 

Digha va ye mahanta va 

Majjhima rassaka anukathula

Dittha-va ye va adittha 

Ye ca dure vasanti avidure 

Bhuta va sambhavesi va 

Sabbe satta bhavantu sukhitatta

Na paro param nikubbetha 

Natimaññetha kattha si nam kiñ si 

vyarosana patighasañña 

Naññamaññassa dukkham iccheyya

Mata yatha niyam puttam 

Ayusa ekaputtamanurakkhe 

Evam pi sabbabhutesu 

Manasam bhavaye aparimanam

Mettañ va sabbalokasmim 

Maanasam bhavaye aparimanam 

Uddham adho cha tiriyañ va 

Asambadham averam asapattam

Tittham caram nisinno va 

Sayano va yavat'assa vigatamiddho 

Etam satim adhittheyya 

Brahmametam viharam idhamahu

Ditthiñ va anupagamma sila va

Dassanena sampanno 

Kamesu vineyya gedham 

Na hi jatu gabbhaseyyam punare ti ti

Use
It is often recited as part of religious services in the Theravāda tradition, but is also popular within the Mahayana tradition.

It has been reported that Buddhist monks chanted the Mettā Sutta as part of their demonstration in September and October 2007 against the military in Burma.

See also
 Brahmavihāra - four "divine abodes" identified by the Buddha, including metta.
 Pāramī - in Theravada Buddhism, mettā is one of noble character qualities generally associated with Enlightened beings.
 Paritta - Traditional Buddhist "protective scriptures", including this sutta.

Notes

Sources
 Bodhi, Bhikkhu (2005a). In the Buddha's Words: An Anthology of Discourses from the Pali Canon. Somerville, MA: Wisdom Publications. .
 Bodhi, Bhikkhu (April 9, 2005b). "Sn 1.8 Mettā Sutta — Loving-kindness [part 1]" (lecture).
 Bodhi, Bhikkhu (April 23, 2005c). "Sn 1.8 Mettā Sutta — Loving-kindness (part 2)" (lecture).
 Gethin, Rupert (1998). The Foundations of Buddhism. Oxford: Oxford University Press. .
 Gunaratana, Henepola (2007). "2007 Brahmavihara Retreat: The Karaniyametta Sutta, Introduction and Stanza One" (lecture).
 Harvey, Peter (2007). An Introduction to Buddhism: Teachings, History and Practices. Cambridge: Cambridge University Press. .
 Kamalashila (1996). Meditation: The Buddhist Art of Tranquility and Insight. Birmingham: Windhorse Publications. . Retrieveable from the author's personal web site at 
 , Bhikkhu (trans.) & Bhikkhu Bodhi (ed.) (2001). The Middle-Length Discourses of the Buddha: A Translation of the Majjhima Nikāya. Boston: Wisdom Publications. .
 Piyadassi Thera (ed., trans.) (1999). The Book of Protection: Paritta. Kandy: Buddhist Publication Society.  Retrieved 08-14-2008 from "Access to Insight" at 
 Rhys Davids, T.W. & William Stede (eds.) (1921-5). The Pali Text Society’s Pali–English Dictionary. Chipstead: Pali Text Society. Retrieved 2008-08-22 from "U. Chicago" at 
 Salzberg, Sharon (1995). Lovingkindness: The Revolutionary Art of Happiness. Boston: Shambhala Publications. .
 Walshe, Maurice (1995). The Long Discourses of the Buddha: A Translation of the Dīgha Nikāya. Somerville, MA: Wisdom Publications. .
 Warder, A.K. (1970; reprinted 2004). Indian Buddhism. Motilal Banarsidass: Delhi. .

External links 
Translations

Loving-kindness, translation of Sn 1.8 by Laurence Khantipalo Mills
Good Will, translation of Sn 1.8 by Thanissaro Bhikkhu
The Discourse on Friendliness Meditation, translation of Khp 9 by Bhikkhu Anandajoti
Loving-Kindness, translation of Khp 9 by Ñanamoli Thera
The Buddha's Words on Loving-Kindness, translation of Khp 9 by the Amaravati Sangha

Readings and chants

 Karaniya Metta Sutta read aloud (talking book) by Thanissaro Bhikkhu
 Anandajoti reading the Mettasutta translation in English
 Sangharakshita reads the Karaṇīyametta and Mahāmangala-suttas, together with other readings from the Pali Canon
 Chandrabodhi chanting the Karaṇīyametta Sutta and other suttas in an 'Indian style'
 Metta Sutta MP4

Essays

 An Analysis of the Mettāsutta by Anandajoti Bhikkhu

Khuddaka Nikaya
Theravada Buddhist texts
Pali Buddhist texts